Allcochayoc (possibly from in the Quechua spelling Allquchayuq; allqu dog, -cha, -yuq  suffixes, "the one with a little dog (or little dogs)") is a mountain in the Andes of Peru which reaches a height of approximately . It is located in the Huancavelica Region, Churcampa Province, on the border of the districts of Coris and Locroja District.

References

Mountains of Peru
Mountains of Huancavelica Region